The following list contains the aircraft used by the Royal Danish Air Force or its predecessors, the Danish Army Air Corps and Royal Danish Naval Aviation. During the Nazi occupation from 1940 to 1945, Danish military aviation was prohibited. The aircraft currently in use are highlighted in blue.

Key
Esk means eskadrille (squadron).
FLSK means Flyveskolen (flying school).
HFT means Hærens Flyvetjeneste (Army Air Corps).
SHT means Søværnets Helikoptertjeneste (Danish Naval Air Squadron).
Bold are present users.

Before the Second World War 

Before the war Danish efforts to acquire new aircraft had been increased. Denmark ordered 12 Fokker G.I together with a production license, and allegedly production of the Fairey Battle for the Danish Air Force was under way when the Germans invaded the country in 1940. Production of 12 Fairey P.4/34 for the air arm of the Danish Navy had started, but could not be completed before the invasion either.
The Italian Macchi MC.200 was chosen as a replacement for the ageing Nimrødderne fighters of the naval air arm, the acquisition contract being ready to be signed at the time of German invasion, but never concluded.
The Orlogsværftet J.1 indigenous Danish fighter design did not reach beyond project stage.

Second World War (Danish Brigade in Sweden)

Post-Second World War 

 [F-35 Lightning ii]

Navy 
Danish Naval Air Squadron (Søværnets Helikoptertjeneste) disbanded 2010 and equipment transferred to air force (Esk 723).

Army 
Army Air Corps (Hærens Flyvetjeneste) ended in 2003 and equipment transferred to air force (Esk 724).

See also 
 Royal Danish Air Force

References

Bibliography 
 Butler, Phil and Tony Buttler. Gloster Meteor: Britain's Celebrated First-Generation Jet. Hersham, Surrey, UK: Midland Publishing, 2006. .
 Crawford, Alex. Bristol Bulldog, Gloster Gauntlet. Redbourn, UK: Mushroom Model Publications, 2005. .
 De Jong, Peter. Le Fokker D.21 (Collection Profils Avions 9) (in French). Outreau, France: Éditions Lela Presse, 2005. . 
 Hall, Alan W. Hawker Hunter - Warpaint Series No 8. Bedfordshire, UK: Hall Park Books, 1997. ISSN 1363-0369.
 Hansen, O.S.:Danskernes Fly, 2003, Aschehoug,  
 Kofoed, Hans. Danske Militaerfly Gennem 50 Ar 1912-62. Copenhagen: Flyv's Forlag, 1962.
 Schrøder, Hans A. Det Danske Flyvevåben, Tøjhusmuseet, Denmark 1992. 
 Schrøder, Hans A. Historien om Flyvevåbnet, Komiteen til udgivelse af "Historien om Flyvevåbnet", 1990. .

Denmark Military Aircraft
Royal Danish Air Force

Danish military-related lists